Organizational effectiveness is a concept organizations use to gauge how effective they are at reaching intended outcomes.
Organizational effectiveness embodies the degree to which firms achieve the goals they have decided upon, a question that draws on several different factors. Among those are talent management, leadership development, organization design and structure, design of measurements and scorecards, implementation of change and transformation, deploying smart processes and smart technology to manage the firms' human capital and the formulation of the broader Human Resources agenda.

Economic Models of Organizational Effectiveness 
In economics, organisational effectiveness is not just defined in terms of profitability, but also the minimisation of problems related to high employee turnover and absenteeism.  As the market for competent employees is subject to supply and demand pressures, firms must offer incentives that are not too low to discourage applicants from applying, and not too unnecessarily high as to detract from the firm's profit maximization capability. 

As organizational effectiveness translates across a broad array of organizational functions, several different models have been developed to achieve flexibility among organizations with  different functions and objectives.

 The Goal-Attainment Approach determines organizational effectiveness by determining the degree to which a firm achieves the goals it has established. This model has a broad scope and calls for a quantitative evaluation of a firm's profit and productivity maximization, its shareholder value and its social and environmental impact. This approach is subject to an assumption that organizations are rational, deliberate and goal-driven, and prioritize the result over the means of achieving organizational effectiveness. 
 The Systems Resource Approach views the organization as an interrelation of subsystems that function together to affect an organization's desired outcomes. Consequentially, if anyone sub-system performs poorly perform its role, the performance of the entire system is negatively affected. Using this approach, organizational effectiveness is measured with reference to an organization's environmental inputs, the inter-relations among its constituent divisions, the degree of flexibility a firm has to respond to changes in the market, and the level of efficiency an organization has when delivering output.
 The Strategic Constituencies Approach establishes that organizational effectiveness is determined by reference to its ability to satisfy the demands imposed by its major shareholders - or "constituents", from which it requires continued support to remain in existence. This model assumes that an organization is composed of several political arenas with vested interests that compete for control over limited resources. As the firm must satisfy the needs of these constituent parts to continue its existence, effectiveness is obtained by ensuring the needs and expectations of the strategic constituencies are fulfilled. This model also accounts for changes in the surrounding environment, whereby an organization must strategically prioritize which constituencies are the most fundamental to its ongoing survival to operate effectively.

Social Science Disciplines 
Rapid advances in social sciences and technology aided by clever experimentation and observation are bringing several truths to the light of society. There are several disciplines of social sciences that help the OE Practitioner be successful.

Four of them are outlined below

Decision Making -  Ways in which real people make decisions, enabling them real time to make good decisions, improving the quality of decisions by leveraging adjacent disciplines  ( for example- Behavioral economics) and replicating relevant experiments, creating new ones and  implementing their results to make organizations effective
Change & Learning – Ways in which real people learn, change, adapt and align, get "affected" by dynamics in the environment and leverage this knowledge to create effective organizations that are pioneers of change and learning
Group Effectiveness – Ways in which real people work well together, especially in bringing new ideas and innovation, working of people to people protocols, the impact of digitization and virtualization in organizations on these protocols
Self-Organizing & Adaptive Systems– Ways in which self-organizing systems and highly networked systems work, learnings from them and the tangible ways by which they can be put to play to make organizations more effective

Application
The broader idea of organizational effectiveness is applied to non-profit organizations in making funding decisions. Foundations and other sources of grants and other types of funds are interested in the organizational effectiveness of those people who seek funds from the foundations.  Foundations always have more requests for funds or funding proposals and treat funding as an investment using the same care as a venture capitalist would in picking a company in which to invest.

According to Richard et al. (2009) organizational effectiveness captures organizational performance plus the myriad internal performance outcomes normally associated with more efficient or effective operations and other external measures that relate to considerations that are broader than those simply associated with economic valuation (either by shareholders, managers, or customers), such as corporate social responsibility.

Multiple dimensions
Scholars of nonprofit organizational effectiveness acknowledge that the concept has multiple dimensions  and multiple definitions. For example, while most nonprofit leaders define organizational effectiveness as 'outcome accountability,' or the extent to which an organization achieves specified levels of progress toward its own goals, a minority of nonprofit leaders define effectiveness as 'overhead minimization,' or the minimization of fundraising and administrative costs.

Hence, Organizational effectiveness is typically evaluated within nonprofit organizations using logic models. Logic models are a management tool widely used in the nonprofit sector in program evaluation. Logic models are created for specific programs to link specific, measurable inputs to specific, measurable impacts. Typically, logic models specify how program inputs, such as money and staff time, production activities and outputs, such as services delivered, which in turn lead to impacts, such as improved beneficiary health.

See also 
 Management
 Organization
 Theory of the firm
 Workplace listening

References 

Organizational theory